The Deputy Minister of Health (Malay: Timbalan Menteri Kesihatan; ; Tamil: சுகாதார பிரதி அமைச்சர் ) is a Malaysian cabinet position serving as deputy head of the Ministry of Health.

List of Deputy Ministers of Health
The following individuals have been appointed as Deputy Minister of Health, or any of its precedent titles:

Colour key (for political coalition/parties):

See also 
 Minister of Health (Malaysia)

References 

Ministry of Health (Malaysia)